Ashkuh (also Romanized as Ashkūh) is a village in Kezab Rural District, Khezrabad District, Saduq County, Yazd Province, Iran. At the 2006 census, its population was 29, in 8 families.

References 

Populated places in Saduq County